Rainbow is an album by American jazz saxophonist John Handy with Indian musicians Ali Akbar Khan and Dr. L. Subramaniam. It was recorded in 1980 and originally released on the MPS label.

Reception

Allmusic awarded the album 3½ stars, stating "This album isn't bad by any stretch, but it's bound to suffer when compared to Karuna Supreme".

Track listing
 "Rajashik - The Majesty of Wisdom" (Ali Akbar Khan) - 8:10
 "Indian Boogie Shoes" (John Handy) - 8:57
 "Rainbow Serenade" (L. Subramaniam) - 6:28
 "Garland of Flowers - Alap and Jod in Raga Mala" (Khan, Handy, Subramaniam) - 9:50
 "Kali Dance" (Subramaniam) - 13:04

Personnel 
John Handy - alto saxophone 
Ali Akbar Khan - sarod
Dr. L. Subramaniam - violin
Shyam Kane - tabla
Mary Johnson - tanpura

References 

1981 albums
John Handy albums
MPS Records albums